Kim Valentin (born 19 March 1963 in Rødovre) is a Danish politician, who is a member of the Folketing for the Venstre political party. He was elected into parliament at the 2019 Danish general election.

Political career
Valentin was elected into the municipal council of Gribskov Municipality at the 2005 Danish local elections and has sat in the municipal council since. He was elected into national parliament in the 2019 election, where 3,448 votes were cast for him. Although he was initially not re-elected at the 2022 Danish general election, Karen Ellemann resigned shortly after her election and Valentin replaced her, thus keeping his seat in the Folketing.

References

External links 
 Biography on the website of the Danish Parliament (Folketinget)

1963 births
Living people
People from Rødovre
Venstre (Denmark) politicians
Danish municipal councillors
Members of the Folketing 2019–2022